Robert of Hauteville (c. 1068 – April 1110), called Scalio, was the third and youngest son of Robert Guiscard, Duke of Apulia, and his second wife Sikelgaita. 

He may have served his elder half-brother Bohemond and his father in their Balkan expeditions of 1084–1085. He was a loyal servant of his eldest brother Roger Borsa, whom he accompanied to Palermo in 1086. He undersigned various documents of Roger's and died in April 1110.

Italo-Normans
Norman warriors
1110 deaths
Year of birth uncertain